Liběšice may refer to the following places in the Czech Republic:

 Liběšice (Litoměřice District)
 Liběšice (Louny District)